Robert Lee Edwards, III (born October 2, 1974) is a former NFL and CFL running back. Originally drafted by the New England Patriots, he also played for the Miami Dolphins and Montreal Alouettes before ending his career with the Toronto Argonauts.

He is the older brother of retired Winnipeg Blue Bombers receiver Terrence Edwards.

Robert currently serves as the head coach of the Washington County Golden Hawks in Sandersville, Georgia.

College career 
Edwards was a featured running back at the University of Georgia.  He was originally recruited to play cornerback, where he was a starter through his sophomore year.  After that season, he was converted to running back.  As a running back he set a Bulldog record for scoring five touchdowns in one game against the University of South Carolina.

Throughout his college career, Edwards was injury-prone. He never finished a full season in college due to knee problems, and missed an entire year due to a broken hand which allowed him to earn an injury redshirt for that season.

Statistics

Professional football career

National Football League 
Edwards was chosen by the New England Patriots in the first round of the 1998 NFL Draft. He rushed for 1,115 yards for the Patriots in the 1998 National Football League season, before blowing out his knee at an NFL rookie flag football game in Hawaii during Pro Bowl week. Edwards barely escaped the injury without having his leg amputated below the knee, and he was told he might not walk again.

Edwards would not play football again until 2002, when he made his return with the Miami Dolphins.  In his first game back, against the Detroit Lions, Edwards caught a touchdown pass and ran for another score.  He spent the rest of the season sharing third-down back duties with fellow running back Travis Minor.  After the season, he lost his spot on the roster to Leonard Henry. Edwards was awarded the Pro Football Writers Association Halas Award for his comeback from his serious injury. Edwards holds the record for consecutive games with a touchdown to start a career. He had one rushing touchdown in each of the first six games and an additional receiving touchdown in Game 5 against the Kansas City Chiefs in his 1998 rookie season with the Patriots.

Statistics

Canadian Football League 
Edwards joined the CFL's Montreal Alouettes in 2005, and was the team's leading rusher, running for over 1,000 yards each of the first two seasons he played in Montreal.  In addition to being the Montreal Alouettes leading rusher, Edwards was twice named a CFL Eastern Division All-Star (2005, 2006).  On August 18, 2007, Edwards was released by the Alouettes.  He was picked up by the Toronto Argonauts a day later.

On January 31, 2008, Edwards was released by the Argonauts.

Statistics

Coaching career 
In 2009, Edwards returned to football as the head coach at Arlington Christian School in Fairburn, Georgia.

On April 19, 2012, Edwards was named as the new head football coach of the Greene County (Georgia) Tigers. He succeeds Charlie Winslett, who is currently ranked seventh on Georgia's All-Time Winningest High School Football coaches list. On January 30, 2018, he was named the new Head football coach at Riverwood High School in Sandy Springs, GA.
In February 2022, Edwards was named head coach at his alma mater, Washington County High School in Sandersville, Georgia.

References

External links 
 ESPN.com stats
 NFL Stats

1974 births
Living people
African-American players of American football
African-American players of Canadian football
American football running backs
American players of Canadian football
Canadian football running backs
Georgia Bulldogs football players
Miami Dolphins players
Montreal Alouettes players
New England Patriots players
People from Sandersville, Georgia
Players of American football from Georgia (U.S. state)
Toronto Argonauts players
21st-century African-American sportspeople
20th-century African-American sportspeople
Ed Block Courage Award recipients